The India women's cricket team played against Australia women's cricket team in September and October 2021, ahead of the 2022 Women's Cricket World Cup. The tour consisted of three Women's One Day International (WODI) matches in September, a day/night Test match at the Carrara Stadium in Queensland between 30 September and 3 October, and three Women's Twenty20 Internationals in October. It was the first day/night Test match to be played by the Indian women's team. The last time the India women's cricket team played a Test match in Australia was during their tour in February and March 2006. 

Originally, the tour was scheduled to take place in January 2021. However, in December 2020, the tour was put into doubt when the Board of Control for Cricket in India (BCCI) did not want to commit to the schedule. On 31 December 2020, Cricket Australia (CA) confirmed that the tour had been postponed by one year. On 20 May 2021, Cricket Australia announced the fixtures for the series. A points-based system was used across all three formats of the tour, with four points for winning the Test match, two points if the Test is drawn, and two points for each win in the limited overs matches.

In August 2021, due to the COVID-19 pandemic in Australia, the tour schedule was moved back by two days, with all of the matches moved to Mackay and the Gold Coast in Queensland. In September 2021, Cricket Australia announced that Claire Polosak and Phillip Gillespie would be the on-field umpires for the one-off Test match.

Australia won the opening WODI match by nine wickets to record their 25th consecutive win in the format. The second match went down to the final ball, with Australia winning by five wickets to win the series. The third match also went to the last over, with India winning by two wickets with three balls to spare, breaking Australia's 26 game winning streak in WODIs, with Australia winning the series 2–1. In the one-off Test, more than 100 overs were lost across the first two days due to rain, with the match ending in a draw late on the fourth day. The first WT20I match was washed out after 15.2 overs of India's innings, with both teams sharing the points. Australia won the second WT20I by four wickets, to take an unassailable 9–5 lead on points across the series. Australia won the third and final WT20I match by 14 runs, winning the WT20I series 2–0, and winning the points-based series 11–5.

Squads

Australia did not name individual squads for the WTest, WODI and WT20I matches, opting instead to name a combined squad of 18 players for the tour. Australia's Tayla Vlaeminck was ruled out of the one-off Test and the WODI matches due to injury. India's Harmanpreet Kaur was ruled out of the first WODI match due to an injured thumb. Following the completion of the WODI matches, Australia's vice-captain Rachael Haynes was ruled out of the rest of the series due to a hamstring injury.

Tour match
Ahead of the WODI matches, the teams played a warm-up match at the Ian Healy Oval in Brisbane, with Australia Women winning by 36 runs.

WODI series

1st WODI

2nd WODI

3rd WODI

Only WTest

WT20I series

1st WT20I

2nd WT20I

3rd WT20I

References

External links
 Series home at ESPN Cricinfo

India 2021-22
Australia 2021-22
International cricket competitions in 2021–22
2021–22 Australian women's cricket season
2021 in Indian cricket
2021 in women's cricket
Cricket events postponed due to the COVID-19 pandemic